Claoxylon longifolium is a species of flowering plants in the family Euphorbiaceae. It is found in Assam, South-East Asia, New Guinea and Caroline Islands.

References

 Kew Bull. 20: 398 1966

External links
 Claoxylon longifolium at the plant list

Acalypheae
Plants described in 1844